A Christmas card is a greeting card sent as part of the traditional celebration of Christmas in order to convey between people a range of sentiments related to Christmastide and the holiday season. Christmas cards are usually exchanged during the weeks preceding Christmas Day by many people (including some non-Christians) in Western society and in Asia. The traditional greeting reads "wishing you a Merry Christmas and a Happy New Year". There are innumerable variations on this greeting, many cards expressing more religious sentiment, or containing a poem, prayer, Christmas song lyrics or Biblical verse; others focus on the general holiday season with an all-inclusive "Season's greetings". The first modern Christmas card was by John Calcott Horsley.

A Christmas card is generally commercially designed and purchased for the occasion. The content of the design might relate directly to the Christmas narrative with depictions of the Nativity of Jesus, or have Christian symbols such as the Star of Bethlehem or a white dove representing both the Holy Spirit and Peace. Many Christmas cards show Christmas traditions, such as seasonal figures (e.g., Santa Claus, snowmen, and reindeer), objects associated with Christmas such as candles, holly, baubles, and Christmas trees, and Christmastime activities such as shopping, caroling, and partying, or other aspects of the season such as the snow and wildlife of the northern winter. Some secular cards depict nostalgic scenes of the past such as crinolined shoppers in 19th century streetscapes; others are humorous, particularly in depicting the antics of Santa and his elves.

History

The first known Christmas card was sent by Michael Maier to James I of England and his son Henry Frederick, Prince of Wales in 1611. It was discovered in 1979 by Adam McLean in the Scottish Record Office. It was hand-made and incorporated Rosicrucian imagery, with the words of the greeting – "A greeting on the birthday of the Sacred King, to the most worshipful and energetic lord and most eminent James, King of Great Britain and Ireland, and Defender of the true faith, with a gesture of joyful celebration of the Birthday of the Lord, in most joyand fortune, we enter into the new auspicious year 1612"  –  being laid out to form a rose.

The first commercially available card was commissioned by Sir Henry Cole and designed by John Callcott Horsley in London 1843. The central picture showed three generations of a family raising a toast to the card's recipient: on either side were scenes of charity, with food and clothing being given to the poor. Allegedly the image of the family drinking wine together proved controversial, but the idea was shrewd: Cole had helped introduce the Penny Post three years earlier. Two batches totaling 2,050 cards were printed and sold that year for a shilling each.

Early British cards rarely showed winter or religious themes, instead favoring flowers, fairies and other fanciful designs that reminded the recipient of the approach of spring. Humorous and sentimental images of children and animals were popular, as were increasingly elaborate shapes, decorations and materials. At Christmas 1873, the lithograph firm Prang and Mayer began creating greeting cards for the popular market in Britain. The firm began selling the Christmas card in America in 1874, thus becoming the first printer to offer cards in America. Its owner, Louis Prang, is sometimes called the "father of the American Christmas card." By the 1880s, Prang was producing over five million cards a year by using the chromolithography process of printmaking. However, the popularity of his cards led to cheap imitations that eventually drove him from the market. The advent of the postcard spelled the end for elaborate Victorian-style cards, but by the 1920s, cards with envelopes had returned. The extensive Laura Seddon Greeting Card Collection from the Manchester Metropolitan University gathers 32,000 Victorian and Edwardian greeting cards, printed by the major publishers of the day, including Britain's first commercially produced Christmas card.

The production of Christmas cards was, throughout the 20th century, a profitable business for many stationery manufacturers, with the design of cards continually evolving with changing tastes and printing techniques. The now widely recognized brand Hallmark Cards was established in 1913 by Joyce Hall with the help of brother Rollie Hall to market their self-produced Christmas cards. The Hall brothers capitalized on a growing desire for more personalized greeting cards, and reached critical success when the outbreak of World War I increased demand for cards to send to soldiers. The World Wars brought cards with patriotic themes. Idiosyncratic "studio cards" with cartoon illustrations and sometimes risque humor caught on in the 1950s. Nostalgic, sentimental, and religious images have continued in popularity, and, in the 21st century, reproductions of Victorian and Edwardian cards are easy to obtain. Modern Christmas cards can be bought individually but are also sold in packs of the same or varied designs. In recent decades changes in technology may be responsible for the decline of the Christmas card. The estimated number of cards received by American households dropped from 29 in 1987 to 20 in 2004. Email and telephones allow for more frequent contact and are easier for generations raised without handwritten letters - especially given the availability of websites offering free email Christmas cards. Despite the decline, 1.9 billion cards were sent in the U.S. in 2005 alone. Some card manufacturers now provide E-cards. In the UK, Christmas cards account for almost half of the volume of greeting card sales, with over 668.9 million Christmas cards sold in the 2008 festive period.
In mostly non-religious countries (e.g. Czech Republic), the cards are rather called New Year Cards, however they are sent before Christmas and the emphasis (design, texts) is mostly given to the New Year, omitting religious symbols.

Official Christmas cards

"Official" Christmas cards began with Queen Victoria in the 1840s. The British royal family's cards are generally portraits reflecting significant personal events of the year.

There is a long-standing custom for the American President and First Lady to send White House Christmas Cards each holiday season. The practice originated with President Calvin Coolidge, who was the first president to issue a written statement of peaceful tidings during the holidays in 1927. President Herbert Hoover was the first to give Christmas notes to the White House staff, and President Franklin Delano Roosevelt was the first president to utilize the card format (rather than the previously used notes or a written statement) that most closely resembles the Christmas cards of today.

In 1953, U.S. President Dwight D. Eisenhower issued the first official White House card. The cards usually depict White House scenes as rendered by prominent American artists. The number of recipients has snowballed over the decades, from just 2,000 in 1961 to 1.4 million in 2005.

Commercial Christmas cards

Many businesses, from small local businesses to multi-national enterprises, send Christmas cards to the people on their customer lists, as a way to develop general goodwill, retain brand awareness and reinforce social networks. These cards are almost always discrete and secular in design, and do not attempt to sell a product, limiting themselves to mentioning the name of the business. The practice harkens back to trade cards of the 18th century, an ancestor of the modern Christmas card.

Charity Christmas cards

Many organizations produce special Christmas cards as a fundraising tool. The most famous of these enterprises is probably the UNICEF Christmas card program, launched in 1949, which selects artwork from internationally known artists for card reproduction. The UK-based Charities Advisory Trust used to give out an annual "Scrooge Award" to the cards that return the smallest percentage to the charities they claim to support although it is not universally well received by the Christmas card producers.

Christmas stamps and stickers

Many countries produce official Christmas stamps, which may be brightly coloured and depict some aspect of Christmas tradition or a Nativity scene. Small decorative stickers are also made to seal the back of envelopes, typically showing a trinket or some symbol of Christmas.

In 2004, the German post office gave away 20 million free scented stickers, to make Christmas cards smell of a fir Christmas tree, cinnamon, gingerbread, a honey-wax candle, a baked apple and an orange.

Collectors items
From the beginning, Christmas cards have been avidly collected. Queen Mary amassed a large collection that is now housed in the British Museum. The University College London's Slade School of Fine Art houses a collection of handmade Christmas Cards from alumni such as Paula Rego and Richard Hamilton and are displayed at events over the Christmas season, when members of the public can make their own Christmas cards in the Strang Print Room. Specimens from the "golden age" of printing (1840s–1890s) are especially prized and bring in large sums at auctions. In December 2005, one of Horsley's original cards sold for nearly £9,000. Collectors may focus on particular images like Santa Claus, poets, or printing techniques. The Christmas card that holds the world record as the most expensive ever sold was a card produced in 1843 by J. C. Horsley and commissioned by civil servant Sir Henry Cole. The card, one of the world's first, was sold in 2001 by UK auctioneers Henry Aldridge to an anonymous bidder for a record breaking £22,250.

Home-made cards

Since the 19th century, many families and individuals have chosen to make their own Christmas cards, either in response to monetary necessity, as an artistic endeavour, or in order to avoid the commercialism associated with Christmas cards. With a higher preference of handmade gifts during the 19th century over purchased or commercial items, homemade cards carried high sentimental value as gifts alone. Many families make the creation of Christmas cards a family endeavour and part of the seasonal festivity, along with stirring the Christmas cake and decorating the tree. Over the years such cards have been produced in every type of paint and crayon, in collage and in simple printing techniques such as potato-cuts. A revival of interest in paper crafts, particularly scrapbooking, has raised the status of the homemade card and made available an array of tools for stamping, punching, and cutting.

Advances in digital photography and printing have provided the technology for many people to design and print their own cards, using their original graphic designs or photos, or those available with many computer programs or online as clip art, as well as a great range of typefaces. Such homemade cards include personal touches such as family photos and holidays snapshots. Crowdsourcing, another trend enabled by the Internet, has allowed thousands of independent and hobbyist graphic designers to produce and distribute holiday cards around the world.

The Christmas card list

Many people send cards to both close friends and distant acquaintances, potentially making the sending of cards a multi-hour chore in addressing dozens or even hundreds of envelopes. The greeting in the card can be personalized but brief, or may include a summary of the year's news. The extreme of this is the Christmas letter (below). Because cards are usually exchanged year after year, the phrase "to be off someone's Christmas card list" is used to indicate a falling out between friends or public figures.

Christmas letters

Some people take the annual mass-mailing of cards as an opportunity to update those they know with the year's events, and include the so-called "Christmas letter" reporting on the family's doings, sometimes running to multiple printed pages. In the UK these are known as round-robin letters. While a practical notion, Christmas letters meet with a mixed reception; recipients may take it as boring minutiae, bragging, or a combination of the two, whereas other people appreciate Christmas letters as more personal than mass-produced cards with a generic missive and an opportunity to "catch up" with the lives of family and friends who are rarely seen or communicated with. Since the letter will be received by both close and distant relatives, there is also the potential for the family members to object to how they are presented to others; an entire episode of Everybody Loves Raymond was built around conflict over the content of just such a letter.

Environmental impact and recycling

During the first 70 years of the 19th century it was common for Christmas and other greeting cards to be recycled by women's service organizations who collected them and removed the pictures, to be pasted into scrap books for the entertainment of children in hospitals, orphanages, kindergartens and missions. With children's picture books becoming cheaper and more readily available, this form of scrap-booking has almost disappeared.

Recent concern over the environmental impact of printing, mailing and delivering cards has fueled an increase in e-cards.

The U.K. conservation charity Woodland Trust runs an annual campaign to collect and recycle Christmas cards to raise awareness of recycling and collect donations from corporate sponsors and supporters. All recycled cards help raise money to plant more trees. In the 12 years that the Woodland Trust Christmas Card Recycling Scheme has been running, more than 600 million cards have been recycled. This has enabled the Woodland Trust to plant more than 141,000 trees, save over 12,000 tonnes of paper from landfill and stop over 16,000 tonnes of CO2 from going into the atmosphere – the equivalent to taking more than 5,000 cars off the road for a year. The scheme has had celebrity supporters including Jo Brand, Dermot O' Leary and Sean Bean and is the longest running scheme of its type in the country.

International Christmas greetings

The traditional English greeting of "Merry Christmas and a Happy New Year" as it appears in other languages:

 Albanian: Gëzuar Krishtlindjet dhe Vitin e Ri
 Basque: Gabon Zoriontsuak eta urte berri on
 Breton:  Nedeleg laouen na bloavezh mat
 Bulgarian: Весела Коледа и Честита Нова Година
 Catalan: Bon Nadal i Feliç Any Nou
 Chinese Simplified (China, except Hong Kong): 圣诞快乐，新年进步
 Chinese Traditional (Hong Kong & Taiwan): 聖誔快樂
 Cornish: Nadelik Lowen, Bledhen Nowyth Da.
 Croatian: Čestit Božić i sretna Nova godina
 Czech: Veselé vánoce a šťastný nový rok. But mostly used is secular 'P.F.' standing for French 'Pour féliciter' (literally 'For happiness in the year...').
 Danish: Glædelig jul og godt nytår! or simply God jul
 Dutch: Prettige kerstdagen en een gelukkig nieuwjaar
 Estonian: Häid jõule ja head uut aastat
 Esperanto: Gajan kristnaskon kaj feliĉan novan jaron
 Filipino: Maligayang Pasko at Manigong Bagong Taon
 Finnish: Hyvää joulua ja onnellista uutta vuotta
 French: Joyeux Noël et Bonne Année
 Galician: Bo Nadal e Feliz Aninovo
 Georgian: გილოცავთ შობა-ახალ წელს
 German: Fröhliche Weihnachten und ein glückliches/gutes Neues Jahr
 Greek: Καλά Χριστούγεννα και ευτυχισμένος ο Καινούριος Χρόνος
 Hungarian: Kellemes karácsonyi ünnepeket és boldog új évet or simply B. ú. é. k.
 Icelandic: Gleðileg jól og farsælt nýtt ár
 Indonesian: Selamat Hari Natal dan Tahun Baru
 Irish: Nollaig Shona Duit
 Italian: Buon Natale e Felice Anno Nuovo
 Kashubian: Wiesołëch Gòdów i szczestlewégò Nowégò Rokù
 Korean : 메리 크리스마스
 Japanese: メリークリスマスそしてよいお年を
 Latvian: Priecīgus Ziemassvētkus un laimīgu Jauno gadu
 Lithuanian: Linksmų šventų Kalėdų ir laimingų Naujųjų metų
 Macedonian: Среќна Нова Година и честит Божиќ
 Malay: Selamat Hari Krismas dan Tahun Baru
 Maltese: Il-Milied Hieni u s-Sena t-Tajba
 Mongolian: Зул сар болон Шинэ жилийн баярын мэнд хүргье
 Norwegian: God jul og godt nyttår
 Persian: کریسمس و سال نو مبارک
 Polish: Wesołych Świąt i Szczęśliwego Nowego Roku
 Portuguese: Feliz Natal e um Feliz Ano Novo
 Romanian: Crăciun Fericit și La mulți ani
 Russian: С Новым годом и Рождеством Христовым!
 Serbian: Срећна Нова година и срећан Божић / Srećna Nova godina i srećan Božić
 Sinhala: Suba naththalak wewa, suba aluth aurudhak wewa
 Slovak: Veselé Vianoce a Štastný Nový rok
 Slovenian: Vesel Božič in Srečno Novo Leto
 Spanish: Feliz Navidad y próspero Año Nuevo
 Swedish: God Jul och Gott Nytt År
 Vietnamese: Chúc mừng Giáng Sinh và chúc mừng Năm mới (acute accent over ơ in "mơi")
 Ukrainian: Веселих свят! (Happy Holidays!) / З Новим роком і Різдвом Христовим!
 Urdu:آپکو بڑا دن اور نیا سال مبارک ہو
 Welsh: Nadolig Llawen a Blwyddyn Newydd Dda

References

Further reading
 Blair, Arthur. Christmas Cards for the Collector. London: Batsford, 1986 
 Brown, Ellen. Christmas, Inc.: A Brief History of the Holiday Card. JSTOR Daily, 21 December 2015. 
 Buday, György. The History of the Christmas Card. London: Rockliff, 1954
 Ettlinger, L. D. & Holloway, R. G. (1947) Compliments of the Season. (The King Penguin Books; K38.) Westdrayton: Penguin Books 39 p & plates
 Higgs, Michelle. Christmas Cards: From the 1840s to the 1940s. Princes Risborough: Shire, 1999

External links

 BBC Devon News Story of the first commercial Christmas card, including picture. Retrieved 2 January 2006.
 BBC 3 December 2005: First Christmas card sold for £8,469. Retrieved 2 January 2006.

Card
Greeting cards
Card